Patrick W. Bell is the seventh and current bishop of the Episcopal Diocese of Eastern Oregon in the Episcopal Church in the United States of America. At his consecration Bell became the 1,093rd Bishop consecrated for the Episcopal Church.

Bell was born and raised in the northern Palouse region of Washington. Raised as an Episcopalian Bell became a Pentecostal minister and professor before returning to the Episcopal Church. After completing seminary studies he was ordained to the priesthood in 1989 by Bishop Rustin Kimsey and began work at St. Matthew's Episcopal Church in Ontario, Oregon. In 2002 Bell was named the rector of St. Luke's in Coeur d'Alene. Bell is married to TinaMarie Bell and has five children and eight grandchildren.

On December 12, 2015, Bell was elected the Bishop of Eastern Oregon on the first ballot. Bell was one of 16 candidates for the position, and one of three finalists. Bell's consecration took place on April 16, 2016. Bell has announced his intention to continue to live in Coeur d'Alene and commute to Oregon to work as the Bishop works on a part-time basis.

See also
 List of Episcopal bishops of the United States
 Historical list of the Episcopal bishops of the United States

References

Living people
Fuller Theological Seminary alumni
Seminary of the Southwest alumni
Episcopal Church in Oregon
Year of birth missing (living people)
Episcopal bishops of Eastern Oregon